Phaegoptera decrepida is a moth of the family Erebidae. It was described by Walter Rothschild in 1909. It is found in Venezuela, Ecuador, Bolivia and Peru.

References

Phaegoptera
Moths described in 1909